The use of performance-enhancing drugs in association football is not widely associated with the sport because of lack of evidence, unlike individual sports such as cycling, weight-lifting, and track and field. Like most high-profile team sports, football suffers from recreational drug use, the case of Diego Maradona and his ban from 1990-91 Serie A by using cocaine during a match is the most known example. Maradona was banned again three years latter by have used ephedrine during the 1994 FIFA World Cup.

Incidence of the use of performance-enhancing drugs ("doping") in football seems to be low. However, much closer collaboration and further investigation seems needed with regard to banned substances, detection methods, and data collection worldwide.

International associations

FIFA
In the run-up to the 2006 FIFA World Cup, the FIFA Congress ratified the World Anti-Doping Agency (WADA) code, being the last of the Olympic sports to agree to "anti-doping". FIFA applies the minimum two-year ban for first-time offenders, although there are exceptions. When a player accused of doping can prove the substance was not intended to enhance performance, FIFA can reduce the sanction to a warning in a first offence, a two-year ban for a second offense and lifetime ban in case of repetition.

In 2014, the biological passport was introduced in the 2014 World Cup: blood and urine samples from all players before the competition and from two players per team and per match are analysed by the Swiss Laboratory for Doping Analyses.

UEFA
Since the introduction of confederation competitions in 1955–56 season, the UEFA's anti-doping controls were applied only in final matches if the European governing body considered it necessary. Since 1987–88 season, those controls became mandatory and systematics at all stages of the tournaments, and even executed without prior notice to representative teams at club and international level.

UEFA announced three doping cases for its competitions in the 2006–07 season, four less than in the previous season. The three failed tests compromised two cases of cannabis and one for a high concentration of Betamethasone in a UEFA Euro 2008 qualifier. In the 2006–07, UEFA carried out 1,662 tests in and out of competitions, including 938 players tested for the blood doping substance EPO.

Individual cases and programs by country

Albania
Besa defender Alban Dragusha was suspended for 24 months by UEFA after failing a test on 19 July 2007 for a high concentration of nandrolone metabolites after a UEFA Cup match in Belgrade.

Argentina
Arguably the most high-profile case of doping in world football is the one of Diego Maradona at the 1994 FIFA World Cup in the United States, who was immediately suspended and later sanctioned for 18 months for intake of ephedrine. Maradona was also suspended for 15 months in 1991 after a failed doping test for cocaine while playing for Napoli in Italy.

Australia
In January 2007, Stan Lazaridis, playing for Perth Glory, failed a drug test for prescription alopecia medication, which is banned due to its potential as a masking agent for other performance-enhancing substances. He was found guilty by Australian Sports Anti-Doping Authority and was given a 12-month suspension from football. He had not taken the prohibited substance to mask a performance-enhancing drug but for legitimate therapeutic purposes as prescribed by his doctor. However, the tribunal held that an anti-doping violation had occurred and ordered the player ineligible to play for 12 months, backdated to the date of his failed test.

East Germany
Unlike other sports in the former GDR, football did not have a government-run doping program due to the fact that football was not seen as internationally successful enough to justify the expense. Doping was carried out sporadically in football and from 1985, doping tests were carried out to prevent this practice. Manfred Höppner, head of the East German sports medicine department, accused Dynamo Berlin and 1. FC Lok Leipzig of doping. According to his statement, in October 1983, when both teams traveled abroad for European Cup matches, a test revealed high traces of Amphetamine and Methamphetamine in 13 of 19 Dynamo players, administered only two-to-three days before. In Lok's players, only slight traces were found and only on some players. Falco Götz, a former Dynamo player and later manager in the Bundesliga for Hertha BSC and 1. FC Nürnberg, denied any active knowledge but admitted to having been administered substances declared to be vitamins in his active time with the club.

England

Testing Programmes in England
So far, only one Premier League player has ever failed a test for using performance-enhancing drugs in a league match. According to a statement of one of UK Sport's Independent Sampling Officers (ISO), "If a club knows in advance we're coming, and the club suspects one of their players, they keep him off training and his name doesn't appear on the list I am given." In the 1999–2000 season, testers were present at just 32 of the over 3,500 league matches, taking samples from two players of each side. Compared to other sports in the UK, like cricket, cycling or athletics, footballers are far less likely to be tested. A case of high-profile was the one of Rio Ferdinand, who missed a drug test in September 2003 and found himself punished for it, being banned for eight months.

In July 2009, the FA was in talks with the World Anti-Doping Agency (WADA) over the FA's proposal to comply with the WADA international anti-doping code (as other UK sports such as rugby, golf and tennis have already done). The FA was at the time under pressure from organisations including UK sport and Sport England to comply with the code and to put forward the first 30 players of the England national team for testing.

A dispute deals with the rules surrounding footballers in the testing pool: Should footballers have drug testing on randomly selected days (so athletes must state their whereabouts for an hour every day) as in other WADA-compliant sports, or should testing merely take place each week at club training?

Cases in England
In the 2002–03 season, Rushden & Diamonds goalkeeper Billy Turley was let off with a mere warning after being found to have taken the anabolic steroid nandrolone. He was later banned for six months for failing a test for cocaine, which is deemed to be a recreational drug, becoming the only player so far to be banned after a domestic league match.

Middlesbrough's Abel Xavier was banned in November 2005 from football for 18 months by UEFA for taking anabolic steroids after failing a test for dianabol after a UEFA Cup match on 29 September 2005. He is the first player in Premier League history to be banned for using performance-enhancing substances, as opposed to recreational drugs.

Adrian Mutu of Chelsea was banned after he failed a test for cocaine in the 2003–04 season. He was banned for seven months and was subsequently released by Chelsea.

In 2016, after a UEFA Europa League match, Liverpool's Mamadou Sakho was alleged to have taken a fat-burning banned drug. However, on later investigation, UEFA opted to dismiss all charges.

France
Jean-Jacques Eydelie, who played for Marseille in the 1–0 final victory over Milan in Munich in the 1993 UEFA Champions League Final, said in L'Equipe magazine in January 2006, that he and several teammates received injections before the match, implying premeditated doping. Former Marseille club president Bernard Tapie has taken legal action over articles suggesting players were given doping substances.

Germany
Peter Neururer, a coach in the German Bundesliga, accused players of his former club Schalke 04 of doping, alleging that almost all players in the club in the late 1980s took Captagon, an illegal substance in most countries, including Germany. Jens Lehmann, then a young player with the club, confirmed the allegations. The German Football Association requested Neururer to release names of players involved in doping. Schalke 04 denied the allegations. Two former team doctors of Eintracht Braunschweig confessed administering Captagon to players of the club in the 1970s and '80s.

Germany national team head coach Joachim Löw insisted he has never seen an example of drug-abuse in German football.

Doping tests have been carried out in the Bundesliga since 1988, and after selected matches, two players are chosen at random to provide a urine sample. In the 2006–07 season, tests were carried out after 241 of 612 first and second division matches. Since 1995, 15 players from the Bundesliga's first and second divisions have been accused of doping offences.

Italy
In Serie A, Parma's Manuele Blasi was banned after a failed test for nandrolone in September 2003.

According to the Gazzetta dello Sport, the death of four former Fiorentina players over the past 19 years were suspicious. Pino Longoni died at age 63 after suffering from an irreversible degenerative illness which narrowed the arteries in his brain; Bruno Beatrice died of leukaemia in 1987 aged 39; Nello Saltutti died after suffering a heart attack in 2003 aged 56; and Ugo Ferrante died in November 2004 of cancer of the tonsils aged 59. The Italian newspaper claimed their illnesses may have been brought on by Cortex and Micoren, drugs that were allegedly administered by Fiorentina's medical staff in the 1970s. However, Turin prosecutor Raffaele Guariniello, who has led Italy's fight against drug-taking in sport since 1998, said without hard evidence the Gazzetta'''s claims that the deaths might be linked to doping were presumptuous.

Spain
French newspaper Le Monde'' alleges that in the course of investigating Operation Puerto, a doping bust primarily focused on cycling, extensive documentation was found of "seasonal preparation plans" for Real Madrid and Barcelona that include notation suggesting doping practices.  Sources suggest that of the 200 sportspersons implicated in Operation Puerto, approximately 50 were cyclists (including notable names such as Ivan Basso and Tyler Hamilton) and the remaining 150 were from other sporting codes, including football. The football players were never pursued in the investigation, leading to claims of double standards between sports.

See also
 :Category:Doping cases in association football

References

External links
 The FA Drug Testing Programme (2003)
 The World Anti-Doping Code-The 2008 Prohibited List

 
Association football player non-biographical articles